Måns Petter Albert Sahlén Zelmerlöw (born 13 June 1986) is a Swedish pop singer and television presenter. He took part in Idol 2005, eventually finishing fifth, won the first season of Let's Dance, and scored a hit with his 2007 song "Cara Mia", which was his entry in that year's Melodifestivalen. Zelmerlöw was the host of Allsång på Skansen from 2011 to 2013. He participated in Melodifestivalen in 2007, 2009 and won in 2015. Zelmerlöw represented Sweden in the Eurovision Song Contest 2015 with the song "Heroes", winning the contest with 365 points. Zelmerlöw and Petra Mede co-hosted the Eurovision Song Contest 2016 held in Stockholm.

Early life and education 
Born in Lund, Måns Zelmerlöw is the son of Birgitta Sahlén, a professor at Lund University, and surgeon Sven-Olof Zelmerlöw. Zelmerlöw studied music in high school in Lund and was part of a school choir project. In 2002, he played one of the brothers in the musical Joseph and the Amazing Technicolor Dreamcoat at Slagthuset in Malmö.

Career

2005: Idol 

Zelmerlöw first entered the public eye in 2005, when he took part in season 2 of the Swedish version of Idol, which was broadcast on TV4. He came in fifth place overall, and was eliminated on 11 November after eight weeks on the show. He had placed in the bottom three once and the bottom two twice.

2006: Let's Dance 

Zelmerlöw took part in the first season of Let's Dance in 2006, partnering with Maria Karlsson. They won the competition, defeating singer Anna Book in the final.

In the same year, he also appeared in the Swedish version of the musical Grease, playing the lead role of Danny Zuko. As a result, Zelmerlöw signed a record deal to release an solo album with M&L Records, a division of Warner Music Sweden.

2007–2008: Melodifestivalen and Stand by For... 

In November 2006, it was announced that Zelmerlöw would compete in Melodifestivalen 2007, Sweden's national final for the Eurovision Song Contest 2007, to be held in Helsinki, Finland. He competed with the song "Cara Mia" in the third semi-final on 17 February 2007 in Örnsköldsvik, and progressed to the final, which was held on 10 March at Globen in Stockholm. There his performance of "Cara Mia" finished in third place behind winners The Ark and runner-up Andreas Johnson. "Cara Mia" was released as a single and Zelmerlöw's debut album Stand by For... followed shortly after.
The album reached number one in Sweden and was certified platinum by IFPI. Four singles were released from the album, all of which reached the top 50 in Sweden. Stand by For... was also released in Poland in September 2007.

On 5 October 2007, Zelmerlöw was the presenter of Lilla Melodifestivalen on SVT. He also participated in the musical version of Footloose, playing Tommy. The musical was performed in both Gothenburg and Stockholm. In 2008, he participated in the Diggiloo tour along with singers Lasse Holm, Linda Bengtzing, Lotta Engberg, Thomas Pettersson, Molly Sandén and Nanne Grönvall.

2009: Melodifestivalen MZW 

On 18 November 2008, it was announced that Zelmerlöw would again compete in Melodifestivalen, this time with the song "Hope & Glory". The 2009 contest featured many former entrants, including Sarah Dawn Finer, Sofia, BWO and Amy Diamond. He took part in the second semi-final on 14 February 2009, and again progressed to the final on 14 March at Globen. "Hope & Glory" ultimately placed fourth, despite receiving the most votes from the jury.

In 2008, Zelmerlöw went back to the studio to work on his second solo album, MZW, which was released in late March 2009. It was certified gold by the IFPI and reached number one on the Swedish album charts. The album was also released in Poland. In 2009 he played a summer tour of Sweden performing songs from both albums.

2010–2011: hosting Melodifestivalen and Allsång på Skansen 

On 10 November 2009, it was announced that Zelmerlöw would host Melodifestivalen 2010, alongside Dolph Lundgren and Christine Meltzer. He hosted the first semi-final and the final with Lundgren and Meltzer, and the remaining semi-finals with only Meltzer. In the opening of the Second Chance round, he performed the Duran Duran song "A View to a Kill", and in the final he sang the Survivor song "Eye of the Tiger" with his fellow presenters. He also acted as Romeo in the musical Romeo and Juliet, and guest starred in the talent show Jakten på Julia at SVT, where Lisette Pagler won the role as Juliet. The musical had its premiere in December at Göta Lejon.

In January 2011, Zelmerlöw was announced as the replacement for Anders Lundin as presenter of Allsång på Skansen, broadcast on SVT. He also presented the show in 2012.

2013–2014: Barcelona Sessions 

In March 2013, Zelmerlöw revealed plans for his third studio album, Barcelona Sessions, unveiling a new single, "Broken Parts". He also performed a new track on Swedish television called "Run for Your Life". In September 2013, Zelmerlöw unveiled the second single from the new album, called "Beautiful Life", and performed another album track entitled "Parallels". The album was released on 5 February 2014, preceded by "Run for Your Life".

In the summer of 2013, Zelmerlöw presented Allsång på Skansen on SVT and revealed that he was leaving the show in the final programme on 13 August. Singer Petra Marklund replaced him.

Zelmerlöw participated as a songwriter in Melodifestivalen 2013, co-writing the song "Hello Goodbye", performed by singers Erik Segerstedt and Tone Damli. The song made it to the second-chance round. In late 2013, he had the lead role in the new version of the Swedish musical Spök along with Loa Falkman, Sussie Eriksson and Lena Philipsson.

2015–2016: Eurovision Song Contest and Perfectly Damaged 

In 2015, Zelmerlöw again participated in Melodifestivalen with the song "Heroes", which scored 288 points and won the final. In the same festival, he co-wrote the entry "Det rår vi inte för", which was performed by Behrang Miri, and which made it to the second-chance round.

On 11 May 2015, Zelmerlöw revealed the artwork and track list for his fourth studio album Perfectly Damaged, which was released on 5 June 2015. On 17 May, Zelmerlöw performed the song "Heroes" in Belgrade during the first live show of X Factor Adria.

Leading up to the Eurovision Song Contest 2015, Zelmerlöw was predicted as the winner by the majority of the betting companies. Zelmerlöw participated in the second semifinal on 21 May, where he came first with 217 points (receiving the highest score from a record 14 countries) and qualified for the final. Zelmerlöw won the Eurovision 2015 final, scoring 365 points.

Throughout the summer of 2015, he made several appearances at music festivals in Sweden and Finland before embarking on a 17-date European tour in September. According to his Twitter and Instagram, before the European tour, he would make his way to Shanghai, China for a visit, promoting his latest album "Perfectly Damaged".

In the end of January 2016, Zelmerlöw travelled to Australia and sang at Guy Sebastian's 28 date Concert Tour "You..Me..Us Tour" as a surprise guest artist.  Zelmerlöw and his band performed at two dates to the delight of Australian audiences who attended Jupiters Hotel and Casino, Gold Coast and regional Grafton to see the Guy Sebastian show.

In May 2016, he co-hosted Eurovision Song Contest 2016 in Stockholm with Swedish TV presenter Petra Mede. During the three shows Måns performed his winning song "Heroes", his new song "Fire in the Rain", and two musical sketches both co-written with Edward af Sillén, "Story of ESC" and the acclaimed "Love, Love, Peace, Peace" with Petra Mede.

In October 2016, he was featured in the TV series Chevaleresk with host Alexander Wiberg. It was broadcast on TV6 .

2016–2018: Chameleon 

Zelmerlöw's seventh studio album, Chameleon, was released in December 2016. The lead single "Hanging on to Nothing", had been released the previous August. The song failed to chart on the Official Swedish Singles chart, but peaked at number 2 on the Heatseekers chart. On November 5, 2016, the French version of "Hanging on to Nothing" was released titled "Rien que nous deux" ("Only the two of us" in English).

In 2017, Zelmerlöw was the co-commentator for SVT at the Eurovision Song Contest 2017 alongside Edward af Sillén, Zelmerlöw also appeared in a sketch involving the three hosts; Oleksandr Skichko, Volodymyr Ostapchuk, and Timur Miroshnychenko.

On 16 November 2017, it was announced that Zelmerlöw would co-host BBC's Eurovision: You Decide with Mel Giedroyc on 7 February 2018 at the Brighton Dome. He opened the show with a medley of ABBA hits, duetting with UK Eurovision entrant Lucie Jones.

In 2018 his song "Happyland", released on the Chameleon album, was chosen by confectionery company Kinder to celebrate its 50th anniversary through commercials broadcast in European countries such as Germany and Italy.

2019–present: Time 

On 1 March 2019 Zelmerlöw and Swedish singer Dotter released the song Walk With Me.

Zelmerlöw announced in May 2019 that he would release the songs Better Now and Grow Up to Be You.

As part of the Eurovision Song Contest 2019 interval act, he covered his favourite entry of 2018, "Fuego", by Eleni Foureira, whilst the Greek singer covered "Dancing Lasha Tumbai" and Conchita covered his song "Heroes", before the acts convened for a version of "Hallelujah". Måns released his version of "Fuego" on iTunes, where the mention of the word "pelican" is removed due to the possible reference to the female anatomy.

On 18 October 2019 Zelmerlöw released his eighth studio album, Time. As a third single, the song One has been released on 21 November 2019 for digital download.

Zelmerlöw was part of the jury of Eurovision: Australia Decides 2020  and also performed the single Walk With Me, which has been re-released with Australian singer Dami Im on 6 February 2020.

Zelmerlöw and Morgan Sulele released the Single Gamle Dager on 10 April 2020. The song contains Norwegian and Swedish lyrics.

As the fourth single from Zelmerlöw´s album Time the song On My Way has been released on 24 April 2020.

In the winter of 2020, Zelmerlöw and Per Andersson did a Christmas show together called Tomen och Bocken - En slags julshow at Hamburger Börs directed by Edward af Sillén who he had previous worked with on Melodifestivalen and Eurovision, but because of the COVID-19 pandemic only a few days of the show was able to be done before it had to be cancelled.

In 2021, he teamed up with fellow Eurovision 2015 contestant Polina Gagarina to record the official song for the World Figure Skating Championships 2021. Released on 21 February 2021, the single was called Circles and Squares.

In 2023, as part of the lead-up for the Eurovision Song Contest 2023 set to be held in Liverpool, he was a co-presenter of the weekly BBC Sounds podcast Eurovisioncast on BBC Radio 5.

Personal life 
Zelmerlöw has one younger sister, Fanny (b. 1989). He most enjoys padel, football, tennis and golf.

On 26 December 2004, Zelmerlöw and his family survived the Indian Ocean earthquake  while on vacation in Khao Lak, Thailand.

In March 2014, while a guest on Swedish cooking show Pluras kök, Zelmerlöw commented that he considered homosexuality an avvikelse (English: deviation). On the show, he said he did not think there was anything wrong with homosexuality, but that it is not natural biologically, since it does not lead to reproduction. He later apologised repeatedly for his remarks, claiming that they were a miscommunication. After his Melodifestivalen win a year later, the incident came under international media scrutiny, prompting a few members of gay, Swedish and Eurovision media to come to Zelmerlöw's defence. He later said that "if I got that feeling" he would date a man.

Between 2008 and 2011, he was in a relationship with the Swedish singer and model Marie Serneholt, a former member of the Swedish pop band A-Teens. In 2016, Zelmerlöw began dating British actress Ciara Janson and they later announced their engagement. In December 2017, Zelmerlöw announced that they were expecting a child together. A few weeks later, he confirmed that the child would be a boy. The couple live in Surrey, just outside of London. On 25 May 2018 he announced via social media that Ciara had given birth to their son, Albert. The couple married on 5 September 2019.
On 9 August 2022, Zelmerlöw announced on Instagram that Ciara had given birth to their second son, Ossian Matteus Zelmerlöw.

Discography 

Stand by For... (2007)
MZW (2009)
Christmas with Friends (2010)
Kära vinter (2011)
Barcelona Sessions (2014)
Perfectly Damaged (2015)
Chameleon (2016)
Time (2019)

References

External links 

 

1986 births
Living people
Swedish pop singers
Swedish television hosts
English-language singers from Sweden
Swedish-language singers
Spanish-language singers of Sweden
Dancing with the Stars winners
Idol (Swedish TV series) participants
People from Lund
Warner Music Group artists
Eurovision Song Contest entrants for Sweden
Eurovision Song Contest entrants of 2015
Melodifestivalen winners
Eurovision Song Contest winners
21st-century Swedish singers
21st-century Swedish male singers
Melodifestivalen contestants of 2015
Melodifestivalen contestants of 2009
Melodifestivalen contestants of 2007
Melodifestivalen contestants of 2006